Taita Hills Wildlife Sanctuary is a privately owned wildlife sanctuary and national park in Kenya established in 1972 by Hilton international. It is located in Taita-Taveta County approximately 220 kilometers from Mombasa and 360 km south of Nairobi. It hosts cape buffalo, African bush elephant, leopard, lion, cheetah, Masai giraffe, zebra, hartebeest, impala, waterbuck, Thomson's gazelle, lesser kudu, dik-dik, Hyena , and other smaller animals, including a diversity of birdlife

References

National parks of Kenya
Wildlife sanctuaries of Kenya
Protected areas established in 1972
Taita-Taveta County